Hugh or Hugo of Ostia may refer to:

Hugh of Ostia (died 1158), cardinal-bishop of Ostia from 1150
Pope Gregory IX, born Ugolino, cardinal-bishop of Ostia in 1206–1227
Hugh of Saint-Cher, cardinal-bishop of Ostia in 1261–1262
Hugh Aycelin, cardinal-bishop of Ostia in 1294–1297